Elian Demirović (born 1 June 2000) is a Slovenian professional footballer who plays as a midfielder for Fermana F.C. on loan from Inter Milan.

Career

Demirović started his career with Inter Milan, one of Italy's most successful clubs.

In 2019, he was sent on loan to Italian Serie A side A.C. ChievoVerona.

In 2020, Demirović was sent on loan to Fermana in the Italian third division.

References

External links
 

Slovenian footballers
Living people
Association football midfielders
2000 births
Slovenian expatriate footballers
Slovenian expatriate sportspeople in Italy
Expatriate footballers in Italy
Fermana F.C. players